Pike Creek may refer to:

Place name 
 Pike Creek, Delaware, United States
 Pike Creek, Ontario, Canada
 Pike Creek Township, Morrison County, Minnesota, United States
 Kenosha, Wisconsin (formerly Pike Creek)

River

United States 
 Pike Creek (White Clay Creek tributary), a stream in Delaware
 Pike Creek (Mississippi River), a stream in Minnesota
 Pike Creek (Current River), a stream in Missouri

Elsewhere 
 Pike Creek (Queensland), a river in southern Queensland, Australia

Road 
 Pike Creek Bypass, a road in Essex County, Ontario, Canada

See also 
 Pikes Creek, Pennsylvania, United States, a census-designated place